William Roger Ward (January 11, 1944 – September 20, 2018) was an American astronomer.

Born in Kansas City, Kansas, Ward studied mathematics and physics at University of Missouri, and completed a doctoral degree at California Institute of Technology in 1972. He became an astronomy theoretician, studying how planetary systems formed and evolved. His career began at the Harvard's Center for Astrophysics, then he moved to the Jet Propulsion Laboratory in 1977. In 1998 he joined the Southwest Research Institute branch located in Boulder, Colorado. He retired in 2014.

Over the course of his research career, he received the Brouwer Award from the Division on Dynamical Astronomy of the American Astronomical Society in 2003, and the Gerard P. Kuiper Prize in 2011. He was granted fellowship by the American Geophysical Union (2005), the American Association for the Advancement of Science (2006), and the American Academy of Arts and Sciences (2012). In 2015, he became a member of the National Academy of Sciences. Ward died of a brain tumor in Prescott, Arizona on September 20, 2018.

References

1944 births
2018 deaths
American astronomers
University of Missouri alumni
California Institute of Technology alumni
Fellows of the American Academy of Arts and Sciences
Fellows of the American Association for the Advancement of Science
Fellows of the American Geophysical Union
Members of the United States National Academy of Sciences
People from Kansas City, Kansas
Deaths from brain cancer in the United States
University of Missouri physicists